ADT or Adt may refer to:

People
 Ana de Teresa (born 2001), Spanish footballer known as ADT
 Harro Adt (born 1942), German diplomat
 Katrin Adt (born 1972), German business executive

Places
 Ada Municipal Airport, airport in Oklahoma (IATA: ADT)
 American Discovery Trail, a system of recreational trails in the United States

Organizations and enterprises
 Abu Dhabi Terminals, abbreviated ADT, port operator for all commercial ports in Abu Dhabi  
 ADT College, in London
 ADT Inc., formerly American District Telegraph, which provides residential and small business electronic security and similar services in many countries
Adirondack Trailways, an American bus company

Science and technology

Biology and medicine 
 Androgen deprivation therapy, a common component of treatment for prostate cancer
 Arogenate dehydratase, an enzyme
 Azadithiolate cofactor, an organosulfur compound found in some enzymes

Computing 
 Abstract data type
 Algebraic data type, a composite type in computer programming
 Alternating decision tree, a machine learning method
 Android Development Tools, a plugin for the Eclipse IDE
 Asynchronous data transfer

Technology 
 Active Denial Technology, a non-lethal, directed-energy weapon developed by the U.S. military
 Admission, discharge, and transfer system, a system for the structure of other types of business systems
 Automatic double tracking, an audio recording technology
 Air Data Terminal or Airborne Data Terminal

Sports
 Asian Development Tour, a golf tour 
 Asociación Deportiva Tarma, a Peruvian association football club
 Azkals Development Team, a Filipino football club

Other uses
 adt, one of two ISO 639-3 codes for the Adnyamathanha language, an Australian Aboriginal language
 Air Departure Tax, in Scotland
 American death triangle, a deprecated rock climbing anchor system
 Atlantic Daylight Time
 Average Daily Theoretical (also known as "theoretical loss" or "theo"), a calculation used to determine gamblers' casino comps
 Average Daily Traffic, used in transportation planning
 Admission, discharge, and transfer system, backbone system of a healthcare facility